Dear Boys (stylized as DEAR BOYS) is a Japanese sports manga written and illustrated by Hiroki Yagami, published by Kodansha in Monthly Shōnen Magazine. As of June 2007, the Dear Boys series has 25 volumes in total, including the Dear Boys: The Early Days and Dear Boys: Act 2. In 2007, Dear Boys: Act 2 was awarded the Kodansha Manga Award for the shōnen manga.

The story concerns the progress of the Mizuho High School basketball team as it attempts to win the prefectural championship. It also deals heavily with the relationship between the players on the team, especially the two main characters Kazuhiko Aikawa and Takumi Fujiwara.

Plot 

At the outset of the manga, the Mizuho High School basketball team is in trouble, as there are not enough players to play a game. Additionally, the coach has left after a conflict with Fujiwara. However, Aikawa transfers to Mizuho and through his enthusiasm and sheer love of the game, infuses the few remaining members with a sense of purpose.

Despite the fact that there are only five of them (i.e., they have no substitutes), they manage to get the coach of the girls' team to coach them as well. At first, she seems very strict, but later reveals her attachment to her "Dear Boys". Together, they do their best to make their dreams come true and take their team to the top of the prefecture.

The manga isn't only focused on the Mizuho team, but also on several rival teams. In fact, the manga artist spends a bit of time developing the characters of other teams' members.

Characters 

 
He was the one who convinced the remaining players to play basketball again. Mutsumi had once said that it was as if Aikawa reminded them all about how much fun they could've all had playing basketball together. He was once the trump card and captain of the Tendōji High's basketball team. He plays the position of small forward in the team. He also has a knack of being able to jump higher than most people, and that makes up for his height disadvantage. Even though he is short, he is able to dunk.
He is considered to be a genius as can be seen in the anime and it is seen that his skills seem to improve with every game that he plays. He is also the best friend of Masato Sawanobori, the star player and point guard of Tendōji High School and Fujiwara Takumi, the captain of the Mizuho basketball team.
He is always able to encourage the other players no matter how difficult the game is.
He is romantically involved with Mai Moritaka of the girls' team.
 
Fujiwara is a second-year student at Mizuho High. He is often nicknamed Taku by his close friends and seems to be romantically involved with Mutsumi Akiyoshi of the girls' team. Fujiwara also appears to be very close to his long-time friend, Miura Ranmaru.
He was involved in an incident where he was provoked into punching the coach in his first year. The coach has since transferred to another school and Mizuho's boys' basketball team was banned from any tournament for a year.
He has an old injury on his right knee which came from one of his games involving Miura and was ordered by Anzaki to rehabilitate his knee and make it more flexible to improve his playing ability in time for the prefectural tournament.
Fujiwara is the captain of the Mizuho basketball team and plays the position of point guard. He attended Mizuho Junior High and was Miura's teammate at that time as well.
As seen in the anime and said by Aikawa that he (Takumi) is the reason why Aikawa can push himself way beyond his limits. It is denied by Aikawa that he (Fuji) was equal to Masato Sawanabori of Tendouji in  skills.
 
Miura has a calm and quiet personality. He has been Fujiwara's best friend since middle school. Miura was seen not to have good stamina at the beginning of the series. He plays the shooting guard position and is the three-point specialist of the team. It was mentioned in the manga that he would rather be scoring points than being the playmaker of the team. He is also talented at stealing balls from his opponents. He is also the one who can shoot fade away three-pointers.
During the match versus Kadena Nishi, he is forced to shoot NBA 3-pointers to help Mizuho win the match. Unfortunately, he was injured due to a foul made by Kenta Shimabukuro. He was then rested for the subsequent match.
Miura attended Mizuho Junior High and was Fujiwara's teammate at that time as well. He blamed himself for causing Fujiwara's knee injury although it is not his fault. In the anime, Keiko Ogami of the girls' team seems to have a crush on him.
Fujiwara had intended Miura to, before the start of the tournament, become a player to be feared. He wants Miura to be like before, be unpredictable with his pinpoint passes, judgement and sharp shooting.
 
Ishii is an extremely short-tempered person. It was highlighted that his weakness is being easily provoked by the opposing team to foul, and is prone to committing four fouls at a crucial time of a match. However, as the team starts to advance to the final, he has grown mature and his skills were also starting to grow more steady and powerful.
He plays the position of power forward in the team. It appears that he and Dobashi are close friends, having played on the same team during middle school. Ishii attended Takakura Junior High.
And it says in the episodes that he matches with the big machine.
 
Dobashi is the largest in the team. He resembles Miura and has a quiet personality. Although his legs are not strong, he proves to his teammates that he can steal, rebound and defend better than ever before. He plays the position of center in the team.
He is often called "old man" by Ishii because of his hair and appearance. In the anime, before the prefectural championship, he changed his hairstyle. Dobashi attended Takakura Junior High.
As the story passes, he was one of the pillars for the team and his presence is felt. Whenever he was injured, the team performance will fare badly because everyone expects him to be their main guy in defence.

Takashina is first seen practising alone in one episode, and later became the 6th member of the boys' team. It was said that he can play any position in a team. He is extremely talented in shooting three pointers, matching up to Miura's level of skill and excellent in rebounds.
It is said that Takashina was a friend of Ayumi Fuse during middle school.
 
Mutsumi is the captain of the girls' basketball team, and is a close friend of Moritaka's. She seems to be romantically involved with Takumi Fujiwara of the boys' team. She plays as a point guard on the team and used to admire Fujiwara's talent. During the quarter finals match, she couldn't play because of her emotional distress, and she fouled many times and was benched. But after Fujiwara opened up to her before the finals, she played to her fullest, making Mizuho win.
 
Mai seems to be romantically involved with Kazuhiko Aikawa and becomes his girlfriend later in the series. Aikawa nicknames her "Pony/Pony tail" because of her long ponytail when he first saw her.
Her position on the team has never been revealed, neither in the manga nor in the anime. However, after some advice and personal training from Aikawa, Mai has the highest shot percentage among all her teammates when it comes to 3-pointers.
 
Keiko plays as a center for the girls' team and is the tallest among all her teammates.
She appears to have a crush on Miura and is proven on two occasions: one when she gave Miura a 'victory sign', and another when Mutsumi remarked if Keiko would get jealous after seeing a couple of girls approach Miura to congratulate him over the team's recent victory.
 
Masato is Kazuhiko's best friend and another member of the boys' basketball team at Mizuho High school.
 
 
The manager of the Mizuho team, she was in the same junior high as Fujiwara and Miura (one year below them). She used to be a star player in the female basketball team, but suffered an injury that cut off her career as a player. As a result she's become somewhat withdrawn and bitter, to the point the other players think she's too harsh and cold. Over time, however, she warms up to them and does her best to support them.
 
A homeroom teacher and the coach for the Mizuho female team, she takes it upon herself to save the male basketball team from being shut down for good. Being friends and former teammates with Aikawa's older sister, she arranged his transfer from Tendōji, believing he could become the soul that would bring out the best in the male basketball team. While she can be strict, it becomes clear she's very fond of her "Dear Boys", and wants to see them become the team she knows they can be.

Media

Video games 
Two video games were released.
 Dear Boys - Super Famicom (1994)
 Dear Boys: Fast Break! - PlayStation 2 (2003)

Manga 
Another manga installment, titled Dear Boys: Act 4, began serialization in Kodansha's shōnen manga magazine Monthly Shōnen Magazine on October 6, 2018. Act 4 would later receive a prequel, titled Dear Boys Shōnan Dai Sagami Special Selection, that would begin digital serialization in Monthly Shōnen Magazine on February 6, 2019.

Anime 
The anime version of Dear Boys, also known as Hoop Days, was released on TV in Japan in 2003.  Like many Kodansha adaptations (e.g., Peach Girl), it was made on a rather low budget. As a result, it had somewhat lower quality animation than many other shōnen anime that came out in the same year.

Medialink licensed the series in Southeast Asia and aired it on Animax Asia.

It follows the storyline of the manga quite closely. Eurobeat music is played during the games, much like how the music genre is featured during the mountain pass races in Initial D.

Since the company that produced Hoop Days also produced Initial D, they featured an episode of the cast watching scenes from the then-upcoming Initial D Fourth Stage.

Theme songs 
Opening Theme: Sound of Bounce by Da Pump
Ending Theme: Baller No Shougou (Baller's Number) by Chris F.

Episodes list 
An Interesting Transfer Student
Kazuhiko Aikawa has recently transferred to Mizuho High School. When asking a teacher why there was no boys' basketball team he was told that they were not a functioning team and that they were about to be disbanded. Aikawa then declared that he was to be the fifth member of the team so that they could attempt the championship. 
The Resurrection Of The Boys' Basketball Team?
Who Is The Opponent For The Practice Team?
The episode starts with a flashback showing how the star ace from Tendōji High's basketball team wound up at Mizuho. Basketball practice starts and once again the boys, barring Aikawa, don't show up. However the episode shows them all gathering things for basketball or practicing. The final day for the ban has come and Aikawa shows up to the gym to practice a little only to find Miura, Ishii, and Dobashi already there. When Aikawa comments on Fujiwara not being there, he is told that it's not a problem that he'll show up. The next day all five members of the boys' basketball team show up at practice. They play a brief game against the girls only to fail horribly showing that they don't play well together. In order to give them a little initiative coach Akiyoshi pits them against Narita high school in a practice match. The very same team whose coach is Shimojou, the previous captain of the boys' team.
Determination To Win
Counterattack Full Of Wounds
To Each His Own Emotion..
A Disquieting Air
Cold Rain
Because You Are Here....
 Confined Passion
People Following Their Dreams
Meetings Are Sudden
Unengaged Gears
Anxiety and Burden
The Rivals
Dead Heat
Never Give Up
Game Set!
The Finals Opponent Is?
Trembling Hearts
Supporting Family
The Sixth Man
The Finals!
Back and Forth
It's Settled, and Then...
Look Towards Tomorrow

References

External links 
Madman's Official Website for Hoop Days
 

1989 manga
1994 video games
1997 manga
2003 anime television series debuts
2003 video games
2009 manga
Bandai Entertainment anime titles
Basketball in anime and manga
Basketball video games
Japan-exclusive video games
Kodansha manga
Konami games
TV Tokyo original programming
PlayStation 2 games
Shōnen manga
Super Nintendo Entertainment System games
Video games based on anime and manga
Winner of Kodansha Manga Award (Shōnen)
Yutaka games
Medialink
Video games developed in Japan